The 2019 West Coast Conference baseball tournament was held from May 23 through 25 at Banner Island Ballpark in Stockton, California.  The four team, double-elimination tournament winner, Loyola Marymount, earned the league's automatic bid to the 2019 NCAA Division I baseball tournament.

Seeding
The top four finishers from the regular season were seeded one through four based on conference winning percentage.  The teams then played a double elimination tournament.

Tiebreakers:
Loyola Marymount went 2–1 vs. San Francisco to win the #4 seed.
Pepperdine went 2–1 vs. San Diego to finish 6th.
Pacific and Portland only played 26 conference matches as their final scheduled match was rained out. It wasn't rescheduled because it didn't affect the conference tournament.

Bracket

Schedule

Conference championship

All-Tournament Team
The following players were named to the All-Tournament Team.

Most Outstanding Player
Codie Paiva (LMU) was named the Most Outstanding Player of the WCC Baseball Tournament.

References

West Coast Conference Baseball Championship
Tournament
West Coast Conference baseball tournament
Baseball competitions in Stockton, California
College baseball tournaments in California